Wildcat Trooper is a 1936 American adventure film directed by Elmer Clifton and written by Joseph O'Donnell. The film stars Kermit Maynard, Hobart Bosworth, Fuzzy Knight, Lois Wilde, Jim Thorpe, Yakima Canutt, Eddie Phillips, John Merton, Frank Hagney and Roger Williams. The film was released on July 1, 1936, by Ambassador Pictures.

Plot
RCMP Sergeant Farrell arrests a criminal known as the Raven and finds a letter of introduction to do mayhem for a criminal enterprise. Farrell uses the letter to impersonate the Raven where he is hired to steal furs from two feuding fur trappers. Farrell continually wears his uniform explaining that by impersonating a Mountie he will be trusted by everyone.

Cast          
Kermit Maynard as Sgt. Gale Farrell
Hobart Bosworth as Dr. Martin
Fuzzy Knight as Constable Pat O'Hearne
Lois Wilde as Ruth Reynolds
Jim Thorpe as Indian 
Yakima Canutt as The Raven
Eddie Phillips as Bob Reynolds
John Merton as Henry McClain
Frank Hagney as Jim Foster
Roger Williams as Slim Arnold

References

External links
 

1936 films
1930s English-language films
American adventure films
1936 adventure films
Films directed by Elmer Clifton
Royal Canadian Mounted Police in fiction
Films based on works by James Oliver Curwood
American black-and-white films
1930s American films